Knockout is a term used by Impact Wrestling to refer to its female talent. The term is applied universally to wrestlers, backstage interviewers, and managers/valets.

History

Early history

The term Knockouts is relatively new and was not used when Impact Wrestling (then known as NWA: Total Nonstop Action) debuted in 2002. The name originated from a DVD release in 2006 by the company, Knockouts: The Ladies of TNA Wrestling, Vol.1, which focused on its then-current female stars. The name "Knockouts" as a catchall name for the women stuck after that. Female performers have been a part of TNA since the first national show, which featured Alexis Laree, Elektra, Erin Bray, Francine, Miss Joni, Sasha, Shannon, Taylor Vaughn and Teresa Tyler, as well as other female talent, including backstage interviewer Goldy Locks and valets Aleesha and Fluff Dupp. Bobcat also debuted as a valet in a match that was taped during the first PPV, but aired during the second PPV.

Miss TNA (2002)
A Lingerie Battle Royal to crown the first 'Miss TNA' was taped during the very first NWA:TNA weekly PPV on June 19, 2002, and was aired during the second PPV on June 26, 2002. Taylor Vaughn won the first Miss TNA crown. She defended the title against Francine, who soon afterward abandoned her pursuit of the title and engaged in a brief feud with Jasmin St. Claire. Vaughn lost the title when she was defeated by male character Bruce a few weeks later. Although male, he claimed that he should be entitled to wrestle for the Miss TNA crown because he was gay. Bruce held the crown for three months and during his time as Miss TNA he attacked many female wrestlers and fans, enraging the male stars of TNA including Jorge Estrada. The two then had a singles match with the stipulation that if Estrada won, Priscilla would become the new Miss TNA.  Although Estrada won the match, the crown didn't change hands because he won by disqualification. In the next weeks, Bruce's tag team partner, Lenny, tried to get Bruce injured (since the runner-up would then take over the crown should the champion be injured). This led to the breakup of The Rainbow Express, and Bruce's homosexuality was questioned by backstage interviewer Goldy Locks, who claimed she had seen him in the shower with April Pennington. The storyline soon came to a close due to poor crowd reception, with Pennington and Goldylocks walking off together holding hands, as Lenny and Bruce fought over Pennington. The storyline ended with Bruce declaring himself straight and handing his crown over to Pennington. The Miss TNA crown wasn't mentioned on-screen afterward. Throughout 2002, TNA also featured Belladonna in a valet role and former WWE Tough Enough contestant Paulina as a bodyguard.

Post–Miss TNA (2003–2006)
Women's wrestling continued to be a feature of the weekly PPVs before an official women's division was established in 2007. In 2003, cage dancers (many of whom were independent female wrestlers who were then unknown at the time, including Lollipop) were used near the top of the entrance ramp, but this concept was abandoned shortly after its conception. One of TNA's early controversial moments ensued on the March 12, 2003 pay-per-view when Lollipop had her top ripped off during a catfight with S.E.X. member Holly Wood and exposed her breasts throughout the fight. TNA also featured ring girl Athena in many feuds and altercations.

From 2003-2004, TNA regularly used several female wrestlers on their PPVs and television programs, including Trinity, Desire, Alexis Laree, Traci Brooks, Cheerleader Melissa, Nurse Veronica (who also competed as Simply Luscious), and Cheerleader Valentina (who also competed as JV Love); however, they were often primarily depicted as valets who occasionally wrestled. Of all the women utilized at this time, Trinity was the most active in the ring, as she feuded with Desire, Alexis Laree, and Traci Brooks, as well as competed in the X Division. During this time, TNA also briefly featured an all-female faction named "Bitchslap" that consisted of Nurse Veronica, Traci Brooks, Cheerleader Valentina, and Trinity (who only appeared twice with the group). They were engaged in a feud with TNA dancers Lollipop and April Pennington.

Independent female wrestlers were frequently featured on TNA Xplosion and occasionally on TNA pay-per-views, including Angel Williams (who would later return as Angelina Love), April Hunter, Brandi Wine, Daizee Haze, Lucy (who previously competed as Shannon and would later return as Daffney), Malia Hosaka, Mercedes Martinez, MsChif, and ODB (who also wrestled as Poison).

TNA briefly recognized the NWA World Women's Championship in 2003. On March 12, 2003, Leilani Kai defeated Madison to win the NWA World Women's Championship in a dark match on a TNA pay-per-view. On April 19, 2003, Kai defended the title against Desire at a house show, but she was later stripped of the title by NWA President Bill Behrens due to missing several subsequent NWA shows. According to Kai, she skipped the shows because she felt the NWA governing board was not treating the Women's Championship with the respect it deserved, such as not televising title matches on the TNA pay-per-views and TNA Xplosion.

Fewer women's matches were featured toward the end of 2004 and throughout 2005; however, TNA did feature pay-per-view matches pitting Trinity against former WWE Diva Jacqueline and Traci Brooks. TNA also featured Minsa in an on-air non-wrestling role.

Following the debut of the TNA iMPACT! television program in 2005, TNA featured former WWE Divas such as Gail Kim, Jackie Gayda, and Christy Hemme, as well as independent female wrestler Sirelda in prominent on-air roles and feuds. Although most of the prior female talent had left TNA by this time, Traci Brooks remained in an on-air role and TNA added a new ring girl, SoCal Val (replacing Athena) and backstage interviewer, Leticia Cline (replacing Goldy Locks). Gail Kim competed in a few matches that were televised and/or taped throughout 2006 against Sirelda and Traci Brooks, while independent wrestler Amber O'Neal competed at TNA house shows in matches against Kim and Jacqueline. In the fall of 2006, Sherri Martel appeared on TNA iMPACT! in her final televised appearance before her death the following year.

Knockouts Division (2007–present)

The formation of an official women's division began at Final Resolution in 2007 as TNA spent the early part of the year building up the feud between Gail Kim and Jacqueline, who made her on-air return at the pay-per-view also during the summer a feud between Christy Hemme and Roxxi Laveaux took place. The first TNA Women's Knockout Champion was crowned on October 14, 2007, at Bound for Glory in a 10–Knockout gauntlet match which Gail Kim won with lastly eliminating Roxxi Laveaux. Around this time, TNA signed several additional female wrestlers and personalities, including Angel Williams, Amazing Kong, ODB, Shelly Martinez, and Talia Madison who were then renamed after the PPV, as well as valet Karen Jarrett and new backstage interviewer Crystal Louthan. In a stark departure to TNA's past programming where their female talent were often promoted as eye candy with little to no emphasis on athleticism or wrestling ability, in the same fashion as their WWE Diva counterparts during that time period, TNA's women's division emphasized on serious wrestling competition between their female talent, as well as their credibility on par with their male counterparts. Since the inception of an official championship, matches and segments involving the Knockouts have contributed to drawing some of the better ratings of Impact shows.

Since 2008, TNA continued to expand the women's division by featuring various prospective independent talents, veterans, and reality show winners such as Sharmell, Taylor Wilde, Daffney, Tara, Hamada, Sarita, Mickie James, and  Survivor: The Amazon winner Jenna Morasca while Lauren Brooke became the new backstage interviewer at Lockdown and Daizee Haze who appeared in the first few years of the company returned in a one time match on May 1 losing to Cheerleader Melissa who was also pulling dual role under the Raisha Saeed gimmick at that time.

The division would see the start of many various changes when in August, Gail Kim's contract with TNA expired and instead of renewing it, she decided to return to rival WWE for a second run. At the start of the following year in 2009, Madison Rayne debuted in TNA on January 8 and became the third member of The Beautiful People alongside existing members Angelina Love and Velvet Sky which made the tag team a stable and the TNA Knockouts Tag Team Championship was introduced at No Surrender and Sarita and Taylor Wilde became the first TNA Knockouts Tag Team Champions when they won the final match of an eight–team tournament.

The women's division would see a start of vast departures in fall of 2009 beginning when Angelina Love left the company on September 3 due to visa work issue, Love was replaced by Lacey Von Erich in the Beautiful People stable and then immediately returned to the company the following year on January 14. Later on, Awesome Kong, Alissa Flash, Roxxi, Traci Brooks, Roxxi, ODB, and Tara (although would return two months later on July 11 at Victory Road) all departed from the company mutually or due to controversial circumstances. Madison Rayne made history by becoming the first person to hold both the Women's Knockout Championship and the Knockouts Tag Team Championship simultaneously at Lockdown. On August 8, Francine appeared in a pre-taped interview at the ECW reunion themed Hardcore Justice and Lacey Von Erich, Hamada, and Taylor Wilde departed from the company at the end of the year. Despite departures during this time period, the division continued to grow.

Despite initially departing the company in individual time periods, Angelina Love, Velvet Sky, Awesome Kong, Alissa Flash, Traci Brooks, Roxxi, ODB, Jacqueline, SoCal Val, Mickie James, Thea Trinidad, Karen Jarrett, Christy Hemme, Taryn Terrell, Brooke, Katarina, and Madison Rayne would return to the company in later years either full-time or short lived runs and through special appearances.

In the years of 2011-2013 in which on March 15, 2011, Daffney's contract with TNA expired and was not renewed. then 7 months later, Gail Kim returned to TNA, after spending the past three years with WWE during her second run. Taeler Hendrix was signed to a contract through the company's Gut Check Challenge, becoming the first ever woman to win the contest and in August 2012, Taryn Terrell joined the division as the official referee although later on would be transitioned into an active role to receive a push to feud with Gail Kim. Sarita departed from TNA entering the year of 2013 after her contract would expire. Lei'D Tapa became the second female talent signed to a contract through the Gut Check Challenge. In the summer, the TNA Knockouts Tag Team Championship would be deactivated when on the June 20, 2013 episode of Impact Wrestling, Knockouts Division Executive Brooke Hogan stripped ODB and Eric Young of the title because Young was a male talent. This ultimately resulted in the titles being no longer being listed among TNA's active championships. The women's division would see again the start of vast departures when SoCal Val, Madison Rayne, Tara, Mickie James, and Taeler Hendrix all departed from the company entering the month of July to mid-Fall mutually; Rayne was originally granted a maternity leave in early March due to real life pregnancy, Hendrix's departure made Lei'D Tapa the only female talent signed from the short-lived Gut Check Challenge, and SoCal Val's departure left Christy Hemme as the longest tenured female talent within the company. The vast departures lead to Christy Hemme, Gail Kim, Velvet Sky, ODB, Brooke, Taryn Terrell, Lei'D Tapa, Hannah Blossom, Holly Blossom, Rebel, and Brittany remaining and continuing on with the company. Taryn Terrell would be granted a maternity leave in August due to real life pregnancy. Madison Rayne would return to the company in late November after departing from the company earlier in the March.

Angelina Love would win the Knockouts Championship at the Sacrifice pay-per-view for a record-breaking sixth time A few days later, Lei'D Tapa departed from the company after her contract expired. Throughout August, vignettes hyping the debut of Havok would air on Impact Wrestling. Havok made her debut by attacking Gail Kim and Taryn Terrell after their title match on the September 3 broadcast of Impact Wrestling. During the tapings of Impact Wrestling on September 16, Havok defeated Kim in the main event of Impact Wrestling to win the TNA Women's Knockout Championship for the first time; the match aired on tape delay on October 1. Havok lost the championship three days later to Taryn Terrell in a three-way match that also involved Gail Kim; the match aired on tape delay on November 19.

Towards the end of the year of 2015 in October, for the first time ever, the TNA Knockouts entered a tournament for the vacant TNA World Heavyweight Championship; Awesome Kong, Gail Kim, Madison Rayne, and Brooke were revealed to being the representatives of the women's division in the group. Brooke announced her departure from the company on November 24. On December 29, just weeks before TNA's début on Pop TV, Maria Kanellis signed with the company. At Bound for Glory, Awesome Kong, Taryn Terrell, and Christy Hemme made a special appearance to induct Gail Kim in the TNA Hall of Fame. Throughout 2016, the division included various competitors who just joined the company. Most of them had title reigns with the Knockouts Championship, such as Jade, Sienna and Allie. In 2017, at Slammiversary XV, Sienna defeated Rosemary in a unification match which saw the TNA Knockouts Championship and GFW Women's Championship get unified. During Sienna's reign the title was renamed to Impact Wrestling Knockouts Championship. Shortly after, at Bound for Glory, Gail Kim won the title for the record–setting seventh time and also became the first woman to retire while holding the title. Kim would transition to behind the scenes as a producer. After Kim's retirement, the Knockouts Championship would become vacant in late 2017 as a 6-woman tournament would be held in which Laurel Van Ness defeated Rosemary in the finals to win the championship for the first time.

Two years later, Gail Kim would come out of retirement in a storyline with Tessa Blanchard. Both eventually faced off at Rebellion as Blanchard defeated Kim. Kim would officially retire. Four months later, Tessa Blanchard became the first woman to main event at Slammiversary XVII against Sami Callihan in an intergender match. Most of the year of 2019 revolved around Tessa Blanchard and her continued feud with Sami Callihan and his faction, Ohio Versus Everything. Towards the end of the year of 2019 on the company's premiere on AXS Television, Blanchard became the number one contender for the Impact World Championship after winning a mini tournament. In this year also, Taya Valkyrie became the longest reigning Knockouts Champion surpassing Taryn Terrell.

At Hard To Kill, Tessa Blanchard became the first woman to win the Impact World Championship. Blanchard also became the first woman in professional wrestling to win a major male world championship.

On August 24 at the second night of Emergence special, Deonna Purrazzo defended the Knockouts Championship against Jordynne Grace in the first Knockouts 30-minute Iron man match in Impact history, where Purrazzo was victorious with two falls over one.

On October 23, 2021 Jordynne Grace became the first Knockout to become the Impact Digital Media Champion a intergender title that is a mostly male dominant title in Sunrise Manor, NV at Bound for Glory of 2021 by defeating Chelsea Green, Crazzy Steve, Fallah Bahh, John Skyler, and Madison Rayne in a tournament final intergender six-way match to become the inaugural champion.

Knockouts Division authority figure
In August 2008, it was announced on TNAwrestling.com that Traci Brooks was officially in charge of the Knockouts Division as the Knockouts Division Commissioner, also known as the "Knockout Law".  On screen credit was given to Jim Cornette (at the time, the highest position of on-screen authority the fans saw), who was fed up with the Knockouts, and needed someone who "spoke their language" to control them. In January 2009, Brooks stopped appearing in TNA and Cornette resumed control over the Knockout division. Brooks returned on the March 12, 2009, edition of Impact! as a referee. She was released on March 4, 2010. Since the year of 2009, there has been five female talents who were appointed the role of authority figure in the women's division.

Promotion
The popularity of women in TNA has resulted cross-promotion with other brands featuring the TNA Knockouts.

TNA Knockout DVDs and television specials

 In 2006, TNA released the first Knockouts DVD entitled Knockouts: The Ladies of TNA Wrestling which featured Christy Hemme, Gail Kim, Jackie Gayda, SoCal Val, and Traci Brooks; much similar to their rival company female talent, this video release was the first and only DVD where the Knockouts were featured in select outdoor locations.
 In 2008, TNA released their second Knockouts DVD on October 7, 2008 entitled TNA Knockouts: Knocked Out which featured Angelina Love, Awesome Kong, Christy Hemme, Gail Kim, Jacqueline, Karen Jarrett, Lauren, ODB, Raisha Saeed, Rhaka Khan, Roxxi, Salinas, Sharmell, SoCal Val, Traci Brooks, Taylor Wilde, and Velvet Sky documenting the 1st anniversary of the launching of the division. Karen Jarrett was chosen for the cover, with an alternative cover featuring Christy Hemme.
 In 2017, Impact released the first female anthology entitled The Essential Gail Kim Collection which revolved around Gail Kim's professional wrestling career including her time with the company in her two tenures showcasing favorite matches and her Hall of Fame induction.

The popularity of women in Impact Wrestling has also resulted in the company devoting pay-per-view to television specials to the women's division. At the end of the year of 2009 on December 31, TNA promoted a special four-hour, all Knockout episode of Impact!, titled New Year's Knockout Eve, which featured a tournament for the number one contendership to the Women's Knockout Championship. April Hunter who competed with the organization in its early years returned in this special competing in a tag team match. Six years later, TNA announced the second Knockouts-themed show for the first time which aired on April 17, 2015 titled 'TKO: Total Knockouts'.

In the year of 2010, TNA premiered an all Knockout highlight pay-per-view special on October 1, titled TNA Knockouts: Mad Sexy Volume 1, featuring the best matches in the history of the Knockout division. as Volume 2 premiered February 1, 2011. Three years later, TNA recorded an all knockouts pay-per-view on March 7, which aired on September 6th, titled TNA Knockouts Knockdown. It was part of special series of pay-per-views released by TNA called TNA One Night Only. Since the start of the first event, Trinity, Jacqueline, Alissa Flash, Sojournor Bolt, MaryKate, Thea Trinidad, and Shelly Martinez made special appearances for the company's annual event.

TNA Knockouts Trading Cards
TRISTAR Productions released a TNA Knockouts trading card series on April 28, 2009. The set featured Angelina Love, Awesome Kong, Christy Hemme, Dixie Carter, The Governor, Jacqueline, Jenna Morasca, Lauren, Madison Rayne, ODB, Raisha Saeed, Rhaka Khan, Roxxi, Sharmell, SoCal Val, Sojournor Bolt, Traci Brooks, Taylor Wilde, and Velvet Sky. Also included are cards pairing the Knockouts with male TNA wrestlers.

Playboy
Shortly before leaving Impact Wrestling, backstage interviewer Leticia Cline appeared on the cover of the November/December 2007 issue of Playboy's Sexy Girls Next Door, which included her nude photo shoot.

In an interview with The Sun, Traci Brooks confirmed that Playboy magazine (which previously had a partnership agreement with WWE prior to the organization converting to PG-rated television content) reached a new partnership agreement with Impact Wrestling. Brooks was originally scheduled to be featured in the November 2009 issue including becoming the first Impact Wrestling Knockout to appear in Playboy. However, Playboy decided not to publish Brooks' photo shoot in their magazine. The photo shoot was instead released online through their Cyber Club website on September 17, 2009.

Other

Publications
Beautiful People members Angelina Love and Velvet Sky were featured on the cover and in a pictorial in the December 2009 issue of Muscle & Fitness magazine, which also included photos of Lauren Brooke and SoCal Val. Velvet Sky was named "Woman of the Year" by Modelsmania magazine after featuring on the cover and in a pictorial in the August 2013 issue of the publication. Earlier that year Sky was reunited with former teammate Angelina Love when they featured together on the cover and in a pictorial in the January/February 2013 issue of Modelsmania magazine.

Media
In 2009, Taylor Wilde and The Beautiful People (Angelina Love and Velvet Sky) appeared in the U.S. reality show MTV Made to compete in a match involving a teen trained by A.J. Styles.

Some of the current and former Impact Knockouts have had short television and movie careers outside of Impact Wrestling.  Former backstage interviewer Lauren Brooke hosts Top Ten and Destination Golf on the Golf Channel. SoCal Val appeared in a television commercial for Morphoplex. Christy Hemme had roles in Bloodstained Memoirs, Fallen Angels, and Bubba's Chili Parlor. Hemme has also pursued a singing career and released songs on MySpace and iTunes. Traci Brooks had a role in Zombie Beach Party. Alissa Flash has a role in the 2010 documentary False Finish. Former backstage interviewer Leticia Cline appeared in the fifth season of the reality series Beauty and the Geek in 2008, as well as the Howard Stern reality series Bowling Beauties. Angelina Love had a role in the 2008 indie film titled Good Intentions starring country music star LeAnn Rimes  and Luke Perry. In 2012, Tara appeared in the U.S. reality show MTV Made coaching an aspiring teen trying to be a professional wrestler while Brooke Tessmacher and Velvet Sky also former Knockout Angelina Love appeared in the episode. In June 2012, Velvet Sky had the lead role in Montgomery Gentry's music video for their song "So Called Life". In July 2012, Mickie James featured in Bucky Covington's music video for his song "Drinking Side of Country". In June 2013, Mickie James starred in a Dr Pepper advert, which was part of the company's new advertising program. It featured "one of a kind" individuals talking about the role of Dr Pepper in their lives.

Championships and accomplishments

Current champions
The following list shows the Knockouts that are currently holding all active singles and tag team championships in Impact Wrestling.

Retired championships

Hall of Famers

Miss TNA
The first Miss TNA was crowned on June 26, 2002, when Taylor Vaughn won a 9-woman lingerie battle royal. The title was abandoned in November 2002.

Impact Wrestling's Knockouts Year–End Awards 
The Impact Wrestling Knockout of the Year Award formally known as the TNA Wrestling's Babe/Knockout of the Year contest is a contest where fans vote on Impact Wrestling's official website for who their favorite Impact Knockout for that year, the winners were announced during the Year End Awards on iMPACT!. The award was established in 2003 and ended in 2007. The award was reestablished in 2018.

Queen of the Knockouts (2013–2016)
TNA held a series of matches featuring various Knockouts at TNA One Night Only: Knockout Knockdown. The winners of these matches would advance to a battle royal, with the winner being crowned the "Queen of the Knockouts". It took place on March 17, 2013 from the Impact Wrestling Zone in Orlando, Florida and aired on PPV on September 6, 2013. No queen was crowned in 2017.

Queen of the Cage
The Queen of the Cage match was a professional wrestling match exclusive to TNA. The match was determined annually at the Lockdown pay-per-view event. In 2008, the match began as a reverse-battle royal involving eight wrestlers. The first two wrestlers that entered the cage then competed in a one-on-one match that was won via pin fall or submission. The winner became the number one contender for the TNA Women's Knockout Championship. In 2009, the match was a traditional four-way match. The match type has since been dropped.

Impact Knockouts Tournaments

New Year's Knockout Eve Tournament (2009) 
The New Year's Knockout Eve Tournament took place on the December 31, 2009, edition of Impact!. The winner of the tournament would earn herself a shot at the TNA Women's Knockout Championship on the live three hour Monday night edition of Impact! on January 4, 2010.

TNA Knockouts Tag Team Championship Tournament (2009) 
TNA announced a Knockouts tag team tournament for the new TNA Knockouts Tag Team Championship on the August 20, 2009 episode of TNA Impact!. Round one matches started on the August 27, 2009 episode of TNA Impact!.

TNA Knockouts Tag Team Championship Tournament (2010) 
On the December 9, 2010, edition of Impact! TNA vacated the TNA Knockouts Tag Team Championship, after one half of the previous champions, Hamada, had been released by the promotion, and set up a four–team tournament to determine new champions. The finals of the tournament would take place on the December 23 edition of Impact!.

* Winter replaced Velvet Sky, who had been attacked backstage by Sarita.

Impact Knockouts Championship Tournament (2017) 
On November 23, 2017 it was announced after Gail Kim retired and vacated the Impact Knockouts Championship that it would be a 6-Women tournament to determine who would be the new Knockouts Champion where two triple threat matches will happen and one finals.

Impact Knockouts Tag Team Revival Championship Tournament (2020-2021) 
Over the course of 2020, Impact Wrestling (which had been renamed from TNA in 2017) signed several female talents such as Nevaeh, Tasha Steelz, Deonna Purrazzo, and Kimber Lee, all of which were paired with already established names on the roster. After months of competition between the tag teams in the Knockouts division, on October 24 at the Bound for Glory pay-per-view, Madison Rayne announced that after nearly eight years of inactivity, Impact Wrestling is reviving the Knockouts Tag Team Championship. It was also announced that an eight-team tournament would take place over the next two months to determine the next champions. The brackets were announced in November, with the final taking place at the Hard To Kill pay-per-view in January 2021. At Hard To Kill, Fire N Flava (Kiera Hogan and Tasha Steelz) defeated Havok and Nevaeh in the tournament final to win the revived titles.

2021 Homecoming Tournament 
This was a mixed tag team tournament which was the focus of Homecoming event on July 30, 2021 to crown the Homecoming King and Queen.

Knockouts Knockdown Tournament (2021) 
On the September 23 episode of Impact!, producer Gail Kim announced an eight-woman, one night tournament for the Knockouts Knockdown event, where the winner will earn a future shot at the Impact Knockouts Championship.

Gut Check Winners 
Impact Gut Check (also known as TNA Gut Check) is a reality series that was established in 2004 where both male and female Indy Stars are contestants and compete for a Impact contract. The following list shows only the female Gut Check winners only and the years that they've won.

Pro Wrestling Illustrated

PWI Female 50 / Female 100

PWI Year–End Awards

Sports Illustrated

Women's Wrestler of the Year

Wrestler of the Year

See also
Women in WWE
Women of Honor

References

External links
 Official TNA Knockouts website wrestlingknockouts.com
 Official TNA website impactwrestling.com
 The official TNA roster impactwrestling.com

Professional wrestling slang

Women's professional wrestling